St. Peter's Episcopal Church is a historic Episcopal church located at 239 Second Avenue at Adams Street in Seward, Alaska, United States. The first Episcopal services in Seward were held in 1904 by a priest from Valdez. The church building was constructed between 1905 and 1906 and was consecrated on April 1, 1906, by the Rt. Rev. Peter Trimble Rowe, the first bishop of the Episcopal Diocese of Alaska. The interior of the church is noted for the 1925 reredos of Christ's Resurrection and Ascension which was done by Dutch artist Jan Van Emple.

The church was added to the National Register of Historic Places in 1979.

St. Peter's is still an active Episcopal parish.

See also

National Register of Historic Places listings in Kenai Peninsula Borough, Alaska

References

External links
St. Peter's Episcopal Church website
Recent color photo of the reredos
1930s photo by Sylvia Sexton: Inside the Episcopal church showing the painting of the Resurrection that Jan van Emple did for the reredos of the church

1906 establishments in Alaska
Buildings and structures in Seward, Alaska
Bungalow architecture in Alaska
Episcopal church buildings in Alaska
Historic American Buildings Survey in Alaska
Churches on the National Register of Historic Places in Alaska
Christian organizations established in 1904
Tourist attractions in Seward, Alaska
Buildings and structures on the National Register of Historic Places in Kenai Peninsula Borough, Alaska